

Ultimates

The Ultimates are the alternative Marvel universe, Ultimate Marvel, equivalent to the Avengers.

Founding Members

Shadow Team
Shadow team was transferred to Ultimates and left SHIELD employment with the main team.

Later Recruits

West Coast Ultimates

In the Ultimate Marvel reality, a secret team of Ultimates was formed in the Ultimate Comics: The Ultimates.

Avengers

In the alternative Marvel universe, Ultimate Marvel, the Avengers are a relaunch of the Ultimates project under SHIELD command.

Reserves
The Reserves were SHIELD agents in development, designated as backup and/or for additional training before joining the Ultimates.

See also
 Ultimates
 List of Avengers members

References

Lists of Avengers (comics) characters
Lists of Marvel Comics characters by organization
Lists of Ultimate Marvel characters